Protection of Workers' Claims (Employer's Insolvency) Convention, 1992 is  an International Labour Organization Convention.

It was established in 1992, with the preamble stating:
Stressing the importance of the protection of workers' claims in the event of the insolvency of their employer and recalling the provisions on this subject in Article 11 of the Protection of Wages Convention, 1949, and Article 11 of the Workmen's Compensation (Accidents) Convention, 1925,...

Modification 
The convention revised the principles contained in ILO Convention C95, Protection of Wages Convention, 1949.

Ratifications
As of 2023, the convention has been ratified by 21 states.

External links 
Text.
Ratifications.

Insolvency
International Labour Organization conventions
Treaties concluded in 1992
Treaties entered into force in 1995
Treaties of Albania
Treaties of Armenia
Treaties of Australia
Treaties of Austria
Treaties of Botswana
Treaties of Bulgaria
Treaties of Burkina Faso
Treaties of Chad
Treaties of Finland
Treaties of Latvia
Treaties of Lithuania
Treaties of Madagascar
Treaties of Mexico
Treaties of Portugal
Treaties of Russia
Treaties of Slovakia
Treaties of Slovenia
Treaties of Spain
Treaties of Switzerland
Treaties of Ukraine
Treaties of Zambia
1992 in labor relations